Adolf Hamann (3 September 1885 – 30 December 1945) was a German general. He was executed for war crimes.

Early life and inter-war years
Hamann joined the Schwerin 89th Grenadier Regiment on 16 July 1901. In 1914, during the first year of World War I, he was twice awarded the Iron Cross. In the inter-war years, Hamann served in the Reichswehr and then the Wehrmacht.

World War II
Immediately after the German invasion of Poland, Hamann was given the command of a frontier defense zone on the Polish border, which he held until 8 January 1940. Afterwards, he commanded a reserve infantry battalion until 25 July 1941. From 4 August until 14 January the following year, he headed a regiment in the 239th Infantry Division. After the division was dissolved, he was transferred to the Führerreserve, where he remained until 1 April. Then he was posted as the commander of a regiment in the 370th Division, stationed at Reims, in the French Zone occupée. He was recalled to the reserve on 14 May.

On 1 June 1942, he was promoted to major general and sent to serve as the military commander of Oryol, in the German-occupied area of the Soviet Union. During the Battle of Kursk, while still commandant of Oryol, he was the chief of Gruppe Hamann - a support formation which consisted mainly of the 3rd Brandenburg Regiment and existed from 20 July to 1 August as part of General Lothar Rendulic's XXXV Corps. On 4 August, after Oryol's liberation in Operation Kutuzov, he was made commandant of Bryansk. When it was retaken by the Red Army on 17 September, he became the military commander in Bobruisk, in Belorussia. On 20 June, he was given command of the 383rd Infantry Division, replacing General Edmund Hoffmeister, while retaining his position as commandant of what was now the Fortified Area Bobruisk.

Surrender and trial
On 22 June 1944, the Red Army launched Operation Bagration. The Soviet forces soon overwhelmed the German forces stationed near Bobruisk and encircled the city on the 27th. On 28 June 1944, Hamann, along with the rest of the Bobruisk garrison, was taken prisoner. On 17 July, he was paraded through the streets of Moscow with 50,000 other captured German soldiers, in the aftermath of Bagration. 

On 30 December 1945, a Soviet military tribunal convicted him of war crimes against the civilian populations of Bryansk and Bobruisk. Hamann was sentenced to death and hanged on the same day.

References

1885 births
1945 deaths
People from Ludwigslust-Parchim
People from the Grand Duchy of Mecklenburg-Schwerin
German Army personnel of World War I
Recipients of the clasp to the Iron Cross, 1st class
Recipients of the Military Merit Cross (Mecklenburg-Schwerin), 1st class
Lieutenant generals of the German Army (Wehrmacht)
German prisoners of war in World War II held by the Soviet Union
Executed people from Mecklenburg-Western Pomerania
German people convicted of war crimes
People executed for war crimes
Nazis executed by the Soviet Union by hanging